Here's Your Sign is the debut comedy album of Bill Engvall.  It was recorded at Mark Ridley's Comedy Castle in Royal Oak, Michigan. Following years of success doing different comedic acts, Engvall released a CD of his material, including his most famous piece (after which his debut album was named).  After peaking within the top 5 on both the Heatseekers and Hot Country Albums charts, as well as the top 50 on the Billboard 200, Engvall saw his career take off, as he remains one of the most popular comedians of the 90s.

The title of this album refers to a routine framework commonly used by Engvall, which began with his stating that stupid people should have to wear warning signs that simply state "I'm stupid" so that no one will rely on them or ask them anything. He would then go on to tell several anecdotes in which someone asks an (obviously) asinine question, and the question is then answered sarcastically, followed by the statement: "Here's your sign!" For example, a trucker gets his truck stuck under an overpass, and the responding policeman asks "Hey, you get your truck stuck?" Without missing a beat, the trucker answers, "No sir, I was delivering that overpass and I ran out of gas. Here's your sign!"

Track listing

Charts

Weekly charts

Year-end charts

As of 2014, sales in the United States have exceeded 881,000 copies, according to Nielsen SoundScan.

Credits
Executive Producer: Bill Engvall
Producer: Doug Grau and J.P. Williams
Art Direction by Laura LiPuma
Design by Laura LiPuma and Garrett Rittenberry
Digital Editing by Doug Grau and Ronnie Thomas
Engineered by Donivan Cowart and Martin Cowart
Mastering by Hank Williams
Mixed by Donivan Cowart
Photography by Dean Dixon and Susan Lambeth
Recorded at Mark Ridley's Comedy Castle in Royal Oak, Michigan

References

Bill Engvall live albums
1996 debut albums
1996 live albums
Warner Records live albums
1990s comedy albums
Stand-up comedy albums
Comedy catchphrases